Marzieh Hadidchi (12 June 1939 – 17 November 2016), also known as Marzieh Dabbaq and Tahere Dabagh, was an Iranian Islamist activist, political prisoner, military commander in the Iran–Iraq War, a politician and representative of Hamedan in the Iranian parliament in the second, third, fourth and the fifth Majles. She was also one of the founders of the Islamic Revolutionary Guard Corps.

Early activity
She started her political activities with the Ayatollah Mohammad Reza Saidi circle. She was arrested by SAVAK in 1972 and severely tortured. SAVAK also arrested and tortured her 14-year-old daughter (Rezvaneh Mirza Dabagh).

She escaped prison by  Mohammad Montazeri's efforts and went to London with a fake passport and after 6 months she moved to Lebanon, where she learned military tactics under supervision of Mostafa Chamran. She accompanied Ayatollah Khomeini during his exile in Paris.

After revolution
After the revolution, she became the chief of Islamic Revolutionary Guard Corps in Hamedan. She was one of the three messengers of Ayatollah Khomeini to Soviet General Secretary Mikhail Gorbachev in 1989.

She has been the representative of Parliament of Iran for three terms. She had headed The Association of the Women of the Islamic Republic from 1987 until 2012. She died on 17 November 2016 at Tehran's Khatam Anbia Hospital after long illness. She was buried on the following day in near Mausoleum of Khomeini in Behesht-e Zahra.

Notes

External links
  The messengers to Gurbachov

1939 births
2016 deaths
Deputies of Tehran, Rey, Shemiranat and Eslamshahr
Members of the Women's fraction of Islamic Consultative Assembly
Academic staff of Iran University of Science and Technology
Members of the 2nd Islamic Consultative Assembly
Members of the 3rd Islamic Consultative Assembly
Members of the 5th Islamic Consultative Assembly
People from Hamadan
Association of the Women of the Islamic Republic politicians
Islamic Republican Party politicians
20th-century Iranian women politicians
20th-century Iranian politicians